German submarine U-507 was a Type IXC U-boat of Nazi Germany's Kriegsmarine built for service in the Second World War and the Battle of the Atlantic. She was mainly notable for two patrols she conducted during the "Second Happy Time" in mid-1942, during the first of which she caused havoc in the Gulf of Mexico amongst unprotected American shipping, and then in the second she attacked ships along the coast of Brazil, in an inexplicable and shocking attack on a neutral nation's shipping in its own waters which almost single-handedly provoked the Brazilian declaration of war on Germany.

The U-boat was built during 1941 by the Deutsche Werft shipyards in Hamburg, and commissioned on 8 October 1941, with Korvettenkapitän Harro Schacht in command. Schacht commanded the boat for its entire lifespan, receiving the Knight's Cross of the Iron Cross on 9 January 1943 in recognition of his successful patrols in the preceding year. He never wore his award however, as he was killed with his entire crew when the boat was sunk four days later.

Design
German Type IXC submarines were slightly larger than the original Type IXBs. U-507 had a displacement of  when at the surface and  while submerged. She had two shafts and two  propellers.

U-507 was fitted with six  torpedo tubes (four fitted at the bow and two at the stern), 22 torpedoes, one  SK C/32 naval gun, 180 rounds, and a  SK C/30 as well as a  C/30 anti-aircraft gun. The boat had a complement of forty-eight.

Service history

First patrol
Once the U-507 had completed her working up period of six months following her commissioning, she departed German waters and entered the Atlantic Ocean for her first patrol; an uneventful and simple cruise to Lorient in occupied France, which was to be her permanent home port for the remainder of her life.

Second patrol
The second patrol was more eventful, as the boat rounded Florida at the end of April 1942, taking full advantage of the lit-up settlements on the shoreline to pick and choose her targets amongst the unescorted shipping which bottlenecked between Cuba and the Floridan peninsula. Here she sank four large cargo ships in three days before following the coastline along Western Florida and Alabama, where in three more days she sank four more large unprotected ships, making full use of the failure of the local authorities to enforce either convoy regulations or the blackout. On 6 May she sank the  about 45 miles south-southeast of the mouth of the Mississippi River. On the 12 May she sank the 10,731 GRT Virginia in the mouth of the Mississippi, killing 26 sailors in an audacious attack which shocked the American authorities. Swinging south, she sank a Honduran freighter as she cruised out of the Caribbean Sea, leaving a shaken seaboard behind her. On this cruise alone she had sunk nine ships totalling 44,782 GRT.

Third patrol
Her third patrol was even more controversial, as a fruitless passage across the Atlantic brought her to the Brazilian coast in mid-August 1942. There she searched for Allied shipping hugging the coastline in Brazilian territorial waters heading for North America. Here she again saw unescorted ships and a lit coastline, and Schacht made the inexplicable decision to attack without first ascertaining the nationalities of her targets. The first was the Brazilian Baependy on 16 August, which was torpedoed and sunk with 270 civilian lives. A few hours later the Araraquara was sunk, killing 131 people, followed by the Annibal Benevolo, on which 150 civilians drowned. The next day the slaughter continued, the Itagiba sunk within sight of the city of Valença, killing 36, and the Arara similarly sunk with 20 deaths as she picked up the survivors of the Itagiba. Two days after this, the tiny sailing vessel Jacyra was sunk, and a Swedish ship was torpedoed three days after that. In just one week, U-507 had sunk seven ships of 18,131 GRT and killed over 600 people, all of them neutral civilians.

Although since February 1942 German and Italian submarines had attacked Brazilian ships, during May Brazilian aero-naval forces began to attack Axis submarines. From July popular demonstrations occurred demanding that the Brazilian government officially abandon its neutrality; the political ramifications of what Schacht and his crew had done off the Brazilian coast were enormous. The then Brazilian dictatorship went from a neutral nation somewhat favourable towards the Axis powers, to an enraged opponent in the space of few days, declaring war on Nazi Germany and Fascist Italy. Brazil would send an Expeditionary Force to the Mediterranean theatre of operations, besides the full involvement of its navy in the Battle of the Atlantic.

More importantly, Brazilian Air Force bases were made available to American naval air squadrons, thus denying the U-boats their previous advantage of hiding in Brazilian coastal waters, and giving the Allies air cover across most of the Southern Atlantic, making the job of the U-boats significantly harder. In addition, Germany's standing amongst neutral nations, particularly the formerly pro-German dictatorships of South America, was in tatters, never to recover.

She returned to Germany with her human cargo, and there received the orders which were the result of the Laconia incident, which consisted of a total ban on aiding shipwreck survivors, except ships' officers who were to be captured for information purposes.

Fourth patrol
On her fourth and final patrol she put these new orders to full use, as she sank three British ships off the northern Brazilian coast, and captured the masters of all the ships; J. Stewart, F.H. Fenn and D. MacCullum. These victories had taken her into 1943 with a reputation for success, confirmed when her captain was informed of his Knight's Cross award. On 13 January 1943 U-507 was spotted by a U.S. Navy PBY Catalina aircraft of VP-83 flying from a newly available Brazilian base, which dropped several depth charges on the boat. The site of the attack was 330 miles off the Brazilian coast at Cape São Roque (Cape of Saint Roch). There were no survivors from the entire crew of 56 including the three captives and the boat's new captain Heinz Radau, who was conducting an observation and familiarization patrol.

Summary of raiding history

References

Bibliography

Carey, Alan C. Galloping Ghosts of the Brazilian Coast. iUniverse, Inc. 2004. 

Scheina, Robert L. Latin America's Wars Volume II: The Age of the Professional Soldier, 1900-2001. Potomac Books, 2003.

External links

German Type IX submarines
World War II shipwrecks in the Atlantic Ocean
World War II submarines of Germany
Military history of Brazil
U-boats sunk by US aircraft
U-boats commissioned in 1941
1941 ships
U-boats sunk in 1943
Ships built in Hamburg
U-boats sunk by depth charges
Ships lost with all hands
Maritime incidents in January 1943